The Four Columns ("Les Quatre Columnes" in Catalan) are four Ionic columns originally created by Josep Puig i Cadafalch in Barcelona, Spain. They were erected in 1919, where the Magic Fountain of Montjuïc now stands.

They symbolized the four stripes of the Catalan senyera, and they were intended to become one of the main icons of Catalanism. Because of this, they were demolished in 1928 during Primo de Rivera's dictatorship, when all public Catalanist symbols were systematically removed in order to avoid their being noticed during the 1929 Universal Exposition, which was to take place on Montjuïc.

Moreover, for these same political motives, Poble Espanyol (Spanish Village in Catalan), on the same hill, was the name given to the open-air museum formerly to be named Iberona – in homage to the Iberians, the first inhabitants of what is now Catalonia, Spain. Analogously for the nearby Plaça d'Espanya.

In 1999, the Universitat Autònoma de Barcelona (UAB) commissioned the renowned Valencian sculptor Andreu Alfaro to create four similar columns for its Bellaterra Campus. In contrast to the original columns which were 20m high, these spiral up,  in height, in red granite.

Re-erection 

After eight years of campaigning by Catalanist civic bodies and the pro-independence political party Esquerra Republicana, a replica of the columns was erected in 2010 very close to the original site and following Puig i Cadafalch's original plans.

External links

 Campaign for restoring The Four Columns

References 

Buildings and structures completed in 1919
Buildings and structures in Barcelona
History of Barcelona
Politics of Barcelona
Sants-Montjuïc
Josep Puig i Cadafalch buildings
Tourist attractions in Barcelona
Buildings and structures completed in 2010
Monumental columns in Spain
Buildings and structures demolished in 1928
Monuments and memorials in Barcelona